Captain Hancock Lee (born 1653 - May 25, 1709)  was an American colonial politician. He was a member of the House of Burgesses, a Justice of Northampton County, and a naval officer.

Biography
Hancock Lee was born to Richard Lee I, Esq., in 1653. He was justice in Northampton County in 1677, then moved to Northumberland County where he was justice in 1687. He was a burgess in 1688 and 1689.

Lee married (first) Mary Kendall, daughter of William Kendall. Secondly, he married Sarah Allerton, daughter of Isaac Allerton Jr., Esq.

He was the owner of multiple estates, including one named Ditchley in Northumberland, Virginia.

References

1653 births
1709 deaths
House of Burgesses members